Miss Mississippi is a scholarship pageant and a preliminary of Miss America. The contest began in 1934, has been held in Vicksburg since 1958, and provides more money than any other scholarship pageant in the Miss America Organization.

Four Miss Mississippis have won the Miss America crown: Mary Ann Mobley (1959), Lynda Lee Mead (1960), Cheryl Prewitt (1980), and Susan Akin (1986).

Emmie Perkins of Hattiesburg was crowned Miss Mississippi 2022 on June 25, 2022 at the Vicksburg Convention Center in Vicksburg, Mississippi. She competed for the title of Miss America 2023 on December 15, 2022 where she was the Jean Bartel Social Impact Initiative winner.

Gallery of past titleholders

Results summary
The following is a visual summary of the past results of Miss Mississippi titleholders at the national Miss America pageants/competitions. The year in parentheses indicates the year of the national competition during which a placement and/or award was garnered, not the year attached to the contestant's state title.

Placements
 Miss Americas: Mary Ann Mobley (1959), Lynda Lee Mead (1960), Cheryl Prewitt (1980), Susan Akin (1986)
 1st runners-up: Katherine Wright (1949), Patricia Puckett (1966), Joan Myers (1968), Hannah Roberts (2016)
 2nd runners-up: Donna Pope (1981) (tie), Dianne Evans (1983), Kathy Manning (1985), Myra Barginear (1998)
 3rd runners-up: Christine McClamroch (1971), Wanda Geddie (1984), Christy May (2001), Taryn Foshee (2007)
 4th runners-up: Suzanne Dugger (1954), Toni Seawright (1988), Mary Allison Hurdle (1992), Laura Lee Lewis (2017)
 Top 10: Charlotte Ann Carroll (1963), Karen Hopson (1982), Kimberly McGuffee (1987), Carla Haag (1989), Rebecca Blouin (1995), Monica Louwerens (1996), Kari Litton (1997), Jennifer Adcock (2003), Jasmine Murray (2015)
 Top 15: Laurice McFarland (1925), Jessie Morgan (1952), Chelsea Rick (2014)
 Top 16: Kimberly Morgan (2008)
 Top 18: Dorothy Ely (1933)
 Top 20: Becky Pruett (2002)

Awards

Preliminary awards
 Preliminary Lifestyle and Fitness: Patricia Puckett (1966), Cheri Brown (1979) (tie), Cheryl Prewitt (1980), Donna Pope (1981), Karen Hopson (1982), Wanda Geddie (1984), Kathy Manning (1985), Susan Akin (1986), Carla Haag (1989), Beth Howell (1991), Christy May (2001), Jennifer Adcock (2003), Christine Kozlowski (2009), Chelsea Rick (2014)
 Preliminary Talent: Mary Ann Mobley (1959), Charlotte Ann Carroll (1963), Dianne Evans (1983), Lenena Holder (1994), Becky Pruett (2002)

Non-finalist awards
 Non-finalist Talent: Lennie Nobles (1946), Patricia McRaney (1961), Robbie Robertson (1967), Lenena Holder (1994), Heather Soriano (2000), Sarah Beth James (2011), Marie Wicks (2013)

Other awards
 Miss Congeniality: Doris Coggins (1939), Dorothy Fox (1942)
 Dr. David B. Allman Medical Scholarship: Myra Barginear (1998)
Jean Bartel Social Impact Initiative Winner: Emmie Perkins (2023)
Jean Bartel Social Impact Initiative Finalist: Holly Brand (2022)
 Louanne Gamba Instrumental Award: Hannah Roberts (2016)
 Quality of Life Award 2nd runners-up: Becky Pruett (2002), Asya Branch (2019)
 Quality of Life Award Finalists: Jasmine Murray (2015), Hannah Roberts (2016), Laura Lee Lewis (2017), Anne Elizabeth Buys (2018)
 Rembrandt Mentor Award: Monica Louwerens (1996)
 STEM Scholarship Award Winners: Chelsea Rick (2014), Hannah Roberts (2016)

Winners

Notes

References

External links
 Miss Mississippi official website

Recurring events established in 1934
Mississippi
Mississippi culture
Women in Mississippi
1934 establishments in Mississippi